was a free-to-play digital board game developed by Heroz and published by The Pokémon Company. It was initially released for Android and iOS devices in Japan under the title Pokémon Comaster in April 2016. It later released in other territories in January 2017. On 26 July 2019, The Pokémon Company announced that the game would be terminating its service on 31 October 2019.

Gameplay

Pokémon Duel was a free-to-play digital board game set in the Pokémon franchise. Gameplay is based on that of the Pokémon Trading Figure Game. Two players use teams of six Pokémon figurines, each with unique "moves" and "abilities". Both players start with all figures on the "bench" and attempt to reach a goal point on the opposite side of the board while preventing their opponent from doing the same. Figures may "battle" adjacent ones, with battles involving roulette-styled wheels with differing-sized segments from which a move is chosen randomly. Moves have one of several colors, and the colors of the battling figures' moves determine the outcome of the battle. White and gold moves deal numerical damage; the figure which spins a lower damage value is knocked out and moved to the "P.C.", temporarily decommissioning it. Purple moves, which often give detrimental status effects to opponents, beat white moves but lose to gold moves. Blue moves beat all other colors, but often have no effect of their own, simply cancelling the battle. Red "miss" moves lose to any opposing move. Enemy figures may also be "surrounded" by occupying all adjacent spots; this knocks the surrounded figure out without initiating battle. Players may also use "plates" which give additional effects for figures such as dealing additional damage or moving them in ways not otherwise permitted.  A player may select up to six plates as part of setting up their "deck" of figures.  In addition to reaching the goal point, a player may also win by forcing their opponent to run out of time (5 minutes in a multiplayer game) or by leaving their opponent unable to make a valid move on their turn (a "wait win").

Figures have five tiers of rarity; common (C), uncommon (UC), rare (R), EX, and UX.

Figures can be obtained with a purchasable in-game currency known as gems, generally by purchasing boosters in a gacha-like manner. Figures can be further upgraded by fusing them with other figures and items, using another in-game currency known as coins in the process. The game offers online multiplayer gameplay along with a single-player campaign where the player participates in the "Pokémon Figure World Championships". For multiplayer, the player holds overall and monthly ratings which are boosted by victories and reduced by defeats, using an Elo rating system. Regardless of which mode is chosen, the game requires a constant internet connection to play.

Plot
In the single-player quest line, the player is a participant in the Pokémon Figure World Championships held on Carmonte Island, which hosts a large amount of hotels. Wearing a mask throughout the competition, the player befriends several other competitors including Luca (who acted as a tutorial guide, and later became a hotel owner) and Sharon (who accompanied the player). Throughout the challenge, the player's progress is followed by a group known as the Roger family, who eyed the player's seemingly-sentient AI named Carlo. As of the end of service in 2019, only six out of the ten hotels shown in the game have been unlocked.

Development and release
Pokémon Duel was developed by Japanese company Heroz and published by The Pokémon Company.
The game was announced in March 2016 as Pokémon Comaster for Japan. Comaster was released for Android devices on 12 April 2016, and iOS devices on 19 April 2016. The game later released in other territories under the title Pokémon Duel on 24 January 2017.

On 10 January 2019, the game shut its services in the Netherlands due to a ban on loot boxes in video games.

In July 2019, The Pokémon Company announced that the service for Pokémon Duel would be discontinued on 31 October 2019.

Reception

Pokémon Duel received "mixed or average reviews" from professional critics according to review aggregator website Metacritic. Joe Merrick at Nintendo Life remarked that the game was a "smart, strategic board game" with potential, although "improvements are needed for it to stand tall within the franchise". Destructoid also criticized the pay-to-win tendencies of the game.

By the end of 2018, the game had reached 37.8million downloads and grossed . As of March 2019, the game had reached over 40million downloads.

Notes

References

2016 video games
Android (operating system) games
Free-to-play video games
IOS games
Products and services discontinued in 2019
Video board games
Video games set on fictional islands
Duel
Delisted digital-only games
Inactive online games
Inactive multiplayer online games